Varjo Technologies Oy, commonly referred to as Varjo, is a Finnish manufacturer of virtual reality, augmented reality and mixed reality headsets. The company was founded in 2016 by former Nokia and Microsoft executives. Varjo specializes in developing high-resolution devices that offer clarity comparable to the human eye.

The company's first head-mounted display, Varjo VR-1, was launched in February 2019, and it was followed by Varjo VR-2 and VR-2 Pro models in October 2019. Varjo's first mixed reality device, Varjo XR-1 Developer Edition, was released to market in December 2019. The third-generation products, Varjo XR-3 and VR-3, were launched in December 2020. The fourth-generation consumer product Varjo Aero, was released to market in 2021.
 
Varjo has raised over $100 million in venture capital funding to date.

History 
Varjo is founded by 4 people in 2016 at Helsinki, Southern Finland, Finland

Varjo founders 
Niko Eiden, a co-founder and Board Member at Varjo. Also, a CEO of Pixieray, Computers and Electronics Manufacturing company that specializes in optics. He studied at Helsinki University of Technology.

Klaus Melakari, co-founder and CTO. He has 20 years of experience in R&D, system design and technology. Previously Head of Computational Vision Systems at Microsoft Mobile, Distinguished architect at Nokia. Klaus holds a M.Sc. in Electrical and Electronics Engineering at University of Oulu.

Roope Rainisto, co-founder and Chief Design Officer. He has 15 years of experience in concepting and UX design. He is the Previous principal designer at Microsoft and Nokia, Head of computational vision UX at Microsoft Mobile. He is also an Inventor in 40+ patents. He has a M.Sc. in Technology, Information networks.

Urho Konttori, founder of Varjo. He is a product innovator and program manager who has over 15 years of experience in designing, engineering and managing large-scale hardware and software projects at Microsoft and Nokia. He has been responsible for scouting, evaluating and defining high consumer value innovations such as novel cameras, see-through touch-screen fingerprint and VR headset technologies in more than a dozen mobile products, resulting in over 10 patents. He has also led the development of multiple operating systems, including the Linux-based Nokia N9 and N900 OS. Urho holds a B.Sc. degree in Algorithms.

Funding 
Varjo has raised a total of $162.5M in funding over 9 rounds. Their latest funding was raised on Sep 6, 2022, from a Series D round. Those who invested in Varjo are Foxconn, EQT Ventures, Volvo, Atomico, Mirabaud, Tesi, Lifeline Ventures, European Bank, Nordic Fund, etc. Varjo's customers include industry leaders such as Aston Martin, Boeing, Lockheed Martin, Audi, Volvo Cars, Siemens.

References

External links
Company website

Virtual reality headsets
Augmented reality
Wearable devices